2009–10 Moldovan National Division season is the 12th Moldovan National Division season in the history of FC Dinamo Bendery.

Current squad

National Division results

References 

Moldovan football clubs 2009–10 season